Tor Hogne Aarøy (born 20 March 1977) is a Norwegian former football forward. In a video game by EA Sports, FIFA 15, he is credited as the tallest player in the game, at 6'8.

Club career

Early career
Aarøy began his career with Spjelkavik IL, He then had short spells at Aalesund and Frigg, before returning to Spjelkavik in August 1998. Aarøy was signed by Rosenborg in the summer of 1999, and spent little over a year at the club. However, his time with Rosenborg was marred by injuries.

Aalesund
At the start of the 2001 season he joined second-tier club Aalesund, having previously had a short spell with the club in the autumn of 1997. In his first season back, he scored 11 goals in 26 games.  The next season, he would help Aalesund win promotion to the Norwegian top league for the first time in their history, ending second top goalscorer with 17 goals. The 2003 season was a failure, despite 6 goals for Aarøy, the team finished second last and was relegated. In 2004, he had a decent season and Aalesund was promoted back. 2005 was another poor season, with Aalesund once again relegated. Right before the 2006 season he got a new partner, Dedé Anderson with whom he formed a great striking partnership. During the 2006 season he managed to score 12 goals while Dedé scored 14. In 2007, Aarøy played 20 top division games, scoring 6 goals.

Move to J. League
In 2011 Aarøy moved to Japan to play for J2 League team JEF United Chiba. On 6 March 2011, he scored his debut goal for Chiba against Giravanz Kitakyushu. On 24 April, his second league goal against FC Tokyo came from Australia international Mark Milligan's long throw.
On 3 October 2012 he announced that he was leaving JEF United Chiba at the end of 2012 season. He is not being used by Chiba manager, Takashi Kiyama. Aarøy returned to Norway and Aalesund in 2013, where he played his last two seasons of his career.

International career
Aarøy was called up to the Norwegian national team on 27 January 2009, as a part of caretaker coach Egil Olsen's first squad. He eventually opted to withdraw from the squad to stay home awaiting the birth of his second child.

Club statistics

 2008 season also includes play-off matches (2 games, 4 goals)
 Blank space means zero games or goals. ? = number not verified

References

External links

1977 births
Living people
Sportspeople from Ålesund
Association football forwards
Norwegian footballers
Spjelkavik IL players
Frigg Oslo FK players
Rosenborg BK players
Aalesunds FK players
JEF United Chiba players
Eliteserien players
Norwegian First Division players
Norwegian expatriate footballers
Norwegian expatriate sportspeople in Japan
Expatriate footballers in Japan
J2 League players